Fernando Nicolás Alloco Romano (born April 30, 1986 in Paraná, Entre Ríos), known as Fernando Alloco, is a retired Argentine footballer. He is currently the assistant manager of the Colombia national team.

Club career
Fernando Alloco started his professional career in Argentina, where he played from 2004 to 2010 for Colón de Santa Fe, San Martín de San Juan, Defensa y Justicia and Independiente Rivadavia. Starting in 2011 he played in Peru for Sport Boys, Real Garcilaso and Universitario de Deportes.

After having irregular performances with Universitario de Deportes, with which he was champion of the Decentralized Tournament 2013, Alloco signed a contract in Europe with the Greek Super League side Asteras Tripolis, and started to play in the group stage of 2014-15 UEFA Europa League. The contract with Asteras Tripolis was for three years. Upon signing, he said, "Asteras Tripolis is my big chance. I really wanted to play in Europe, especially in a club with European standards. I saw the club matches for Europa League. I saw the game against Tottenham in London. I can not wait to join the team and be aware of all my teammates."

Coaching career
After retiring in 2020, Alloco was appointed assistant coach of Néstor Lorenzo at Melgar ahead of the 2021 season. In July 2022, Néstor Lorenzo was appointed manager of the Colombia national team, with Alloco as his assistant again.

Honours

Club
Universitario de Deportes
 Torneo Descentralizado (1): 2013

Notes

References

External links
 
 

1986 births
Living people
Argentine footballers
Argentine expatriate footballers
Independiente Rivadavia footballers
San Martín de San Juan footballers
Defensa y Justicia footballers
Club Atlético Colón footballers
Sport Boys footballers
Real Garcilaso footballers
Club Universitario de Deportes footballers
Asteras Tripolis F.C. players
Boca Unidos footballers
Argentine Primera División players
Peruvian Primera División players
Super League Greece players
Argentine expatriate sportspeople in Peru
Argentine expatriate sportspeople in Greece
Expatriate footballers in Peru
Expatriate footballers in Greece
Association football defenders
People from Paraná, Entre Ríos
Sportspeople from Entre Ríos Province